{{Infobox Political post
| post = President
| body = Mongolia
| native_name = Монгол Улсын Ерөнхийлөгч'’
| insignia = State emblem of Mongolia.svg
| insigniasize = 100px
| insigniacaption = State Emblem of Mongolia
| image = Mongolian Prime Minister Khurelsukh Ukhnaa in 2018.jpg
| imagesize = 200px
| incumbent = Ukhnaagiin Khürelsükh
| incumbentsince = 25 June 2021
| style = His Excellency
| status = Head of state
| seat = Ulaanbaatar, Mongolia
| nominator = State Great Khural Political parties with representation nominate candidates
| appointer = Direct popular vote
| inaugural = Punsalmaagiin Ochirbat
| termlength = 6 years; non-renewable
| termlength_qualified = 
| constituting_instrument = Constitution of Mongolia
| deputy = Vice President of Mongolia Chairman of the State Great Khural 
| salary = 39,638,357 ₮ annually (2021)
| formation = 
| website = president.mn
| residence = President’s Residence at the Ikh Tenger Complex
}}

The president of Mongolia (Mongol Ulsyn Yerönkhiilögch'') is the executive head of state of Mongolia. The current president is Ukhnaagiin Khürelsükh.

Political parties with representation in the State Great Khural nominate candidates. The president was originally limited to two four-year terms, but this was changed to a non-renewable six-year term starting with the 2021 presidential election. The president can be removed from office if two-thirds of the Khural find them guilty of abusing their powers or violating their oath. Before inauguration, however, the president-elect must suspend their membership of any political party.

Powers of the president
Nominating a candidate for the office of Prime Minister, who is then approved or rejected by the State Great Khural (parliament). This is a ceremonial responsibility, as the Khural will most likely reject any nominee who is not its own choice – in effect, the prime minister is appointed by the Khural.
Vetoing the Khural's legislation (can be overridden with a two-thirds majority)
Approving judicial appointments
Appointing the chief judge of the Supreme Court of Mongolia
Chairing the National Security Council of Mongolia
Acting as commander-in-chief of the armed forces.
Nominates the prosecutor general, the official in charge of implementing the laws, who is then approved or rejected by the Khural.
Provides guidelines for the activities of the Government.

Residences 
Generally, Mongolian leaders have lived at the president's residence at the Ikh Tenger Complex. The complex is a protected area in the Bogd Khan Mountain. The residence is located next to the mansions of the Speaker of Parliament and Prime Minister.

Winter Palace 
In 2017, newly elected president Battulga said that he intended to live in the "Winter Palace" in central Ulaanbaatar, also known as the marshal's residence, in a departure from tradition. It is located in the heart of the capital between Peace Avenue and Seoul Street (next to the 1st School and the Russian Embassy). The two story-building was built in 1947 as the residence of Marshal Khorloogiin Choibalsan. It has two luxury rooms and five other rooms as well as 52-80 person capacity banqueting hall.

List of presidents

See also
List of heads of state of Mongolia
Vice President of Mongolia
Prime Minister of Mongolia

References

External links 
Official website
 Official website (2008)

 
Government of Mongolia
1990 establishments in Mongolia